William Cree House is a historic home located at Jefferson Township in Greene County, Pennsylvania. It was built in 1792, and is a two-story, three bay, banked stone dwelling. A two-story, log house built in 1847, was moved and attached to the house about 1974.  Also on the property is a banked stone spring house built in 1782.

It was listed on the National Register of Historic Places in 2002.

References 

Houses on the National Register of Historic Places in Pennsylvania
Houses completed in 1792
Houses in Greene County, Pennsylvania
National Register of Historic Places in Greene County, Pennsylvania